The Dar es Salaam University College of Education (DUCE) is a constituent college of the University of Dar es Salaam in Tanzania. DUCE is located in Miburani ward, Temeke municipality close to Tanzania National Stadium. It is one of the higher learning institutions in Tanzania established in 2005 as part of the Tanzanian Government development policy to extend secondary school education in Tanzania. The core activities of the college is teaching, conducting research and offering public consultation.

Management 
The college is managed by the Principal who is assisted by two deputies, the Deputy Principal (Academic) and Deputy Principal (Administration). Currently, the Principal is Prof. Stephen Oswald Maluka while the Deputy Principal (Academic) is Dr. Christine Raphael and the Deputy Principal (Administration) is Prof. Method Samwel.

Faculties 
 Faculty of Science
 Faculty of Education
 Faculty of Humanities and Social Sciences

Faculty of Science 
The Faculty of Science offers Bachelor of Science with Education degree programme with various subject combinations emanating from within the Faculty and from the Faculty of Humanities and Social Sciences.

Such subject combinations include:

 Chemistry & physics
 Chemistry & biology
 Physics & mathematics
 Information sciences & mathematics
 Chemistry & mathematics
 Biology & geography
 Physics & geography
 Physics & biology

Notable alumni
 Irene Tarimo Researcher and Lecturer at OUT

See also 
 List of universities and colleges in Tanzania

References

External links 
 

Colleges in Tanzania
University of Dar es Salaam
Educational institutions established in 2005
2005 establishments in Tanzania